Rémy Roux (1865-1957) was a French politician. He served as a member of the Chamber of Deputies from 1924 to 1932.

References

1865 births
1957 deaths
People from Nice
Politicians from Provence-Alpes-Côte d'Azur
French Section of the Workers' International politicians
Members of the 13th Chamber of Deputies of the French Third Republic
Members of the 14th Chamber of Deputies of the French Third Republic